Tiruvallur district, also spelled as Thiruvallur district, is one of the 38 districts (an administrative district) in the Indian state of Tamil Nadu. The fast developing city of Tiruvallur is the district headquarters. The district has a mixture of urban and rural characteristics. The eastern part of Tiruvallur district is dominated by urban characteristics while the Northern part of the district has influence of Andhra culture due to its position. In 2011, the district had a population of 3,728,104 with a sex-ratio of 987 females for every 1,000 males.

The district has been divided into three revenue divisions viz, Tiruvallur, Tiruttani and Ponneri. There are four taluks under Tiruvallur division, two under Tiruttani divisions and two under Ponneri division. There are 46 firkas and 820 revenue villages. Likewise there are 12 blocks, five municipalities and ten town panchayats which implement rural development activities.

Etymology
The word "Tiruvallur" is supposedly derived from the Tamil sentence "tiru evvull?" from "Tiru" (highness – a common prefix in South India for temple towns or cities) and "evvull" (where do I sleep?). So, Tiruvallur means, a place/town where, the god, Veera Raghavar asked a saint for a place to sleep for a night.

Tiruvallur was originally known as Tiru-evallur, which specifies the sleeping position of the Vishnu or "Perumal", in the Veeraragava temple of Tiruvallur. Later people began to refer it by names such as Trivellore and Tiruvallur. Today Tiruvallur is well known, one of the reason being the Veeraragava Temple, where Amavasya (the commencement of dark moon prior to the new moon) is considered an auspicious day for the lord and so for the people of the town.

The district of Tiruvallur has been carved out by bifurcating erstwhile Chengalpattu district (which was renamed as Chengalpattu-MGR/Kancheepuram at the time of 1991 Census). According to the said bifurcation Tiruvallur revenue division which included Tiruvallur, Tiruttani taluks and Uthukkottai and Pallipattu sub-taluks separated from Chengalpattu district along with Ponneri and Gummindipoondi taluks of Saidapet revenue division and formed this new district. At present this district comprises 9 taluks, namely Avadi, RK Pet, Ponneri, Gummidipoondi, Uthukottai, Tiruvallur, Poonamallee, Tiruttani, and Pallipattu.

In the far past, this region was under a chain of regimes commencing from the Pallavas during the 7th century ending with the Nawab of Arcot during the early part of 19th century when it came under the British rule. In 1687, the Golkonda rulers were defeated and the region came under the Moghul emperors of Delhi. The towns and villages of this region were the scene of Carnatic wars. Battles are said to have been fought in this region during the struggle for supremacy between the English and French. The town of Pulicat was the earliest Dutch possession in India founded in 1609 which was ceded to the British in 1825. With this, the region came under the British rule which ended on 15 August 1947 with India becoming independent.

Geography
It is bounded on the north by Tirupati and Chittoor districts of Andhra Pradesh state, on the east by the Bay of Bengal, on the southeast by Chennai district, on the south by Kanchipuram and Chengalpattu districts, on the northwest by Vellore and on the west by Ranipet district. The coastal region of the district is mostly flat; but in the other parts it is undulating and even hilly in some places.

The northern taluks of the district like Ponneri, Uttukkottai, Gummidipundi etc. do not have much to offer from the scenic point of view. In the Tiruttani taluk, a number of hillocks are found scattered. The soil of the district is mostly sandy, mixed with soda or other alkali or stony. Rocks found in and near the surface are in detached masses. Hence, the soil can't be termed as very fertile. The soil found nearer the sea coast is of the inferior erinaceous type which is most suited for raising casuarinas plants. No mineral of any importance is available in the district. There are not many hills of any considerable height in this district. A few conical hills or ridges of small elevation exist like the St. Thomas Mount. Certain hillocks are found in Tiruttani. Most of the hills and hillocks are rocky and no verdant vegetation is seen in the slopes of these hills. The area under forests in this district is quite meager.

The average normal rainfall of the district is 1104 mm. Out of which 52% has been received during Northeast Monsoon period and 41% has been received during Southwest Monsoon period.

Demographics

According to the 2011 census, Thiruvallur district had a population of 3,728,104 with a sex-ratio of 987 females for every 1,000 males, much above the national average of 929. 405,669 were under the age of six (208,449 males and 197,220 females). Scheduled Castes and Scheduled Tribes accounted for 22.04% and 1.27% of the population respectively. The average literacy rate of the district was 74.88%, compared to the national average of 72.99%. The district had 946,949 households. There were 1,538,054 workers, comprising 60,436 cultivators, 173,150 main agricultural labourers, 41,742 in house hold industries, 972,590 other workers, 290,136 marginal workers, 13,008 marginal cultivators, 97,436 marginal agricultural labourers, 16,498 marginal workers in household industries and 163,194 other marginal workers. Tamil is the official language and there are some white collar English workers and north-Indian workers in the industrial corridor of Gummadipoondi in the district. Telugu minority people also speak Telugu in the district, since the time of the Madras presidency. Telugu residents are settled in the district at 1:20 ratio of the district's population.

After the addition of large parts of the district to Chennai district, in 2021, the district has a population of 2,721,363 of which rural was 2,025,361 and urban 696,012.

Politics  

|}

Economy
Tiruvallur district is one of the fastest developing districts in Tamil Nadu in terms of industrial development. The district has many leading industries like Kamarajar Port, North Chennai Thermal Power Station, National Thermal Power Corporation, L&T Ship Build, NIOT, ITC, IOCL, HPCL, BPCL, Hindustan Motors and CPCL, Ennore (Tondiarpet). It also has the Ennore Thermal Power Station and the Avadi tank factory.

The district has nine industrial estates, six developed by the government and three by private organisations.

Government industrial estates
Electrical Industrial Estate, Kakalur.
SIDCO Industrial Estate, Kakalur
Petrochemical Industrial Estate, Vichoor
SIDCO Industrial Estate, R.K. Pet
SIDCO Industrial Estate, Gummidipoondi
SIDCO Industrial Estate, Thirumazhisai

Private industrial estates
M.M.Industrial Estate, Alapakkam
Moccaram Industries, Velappan Chavadi
Ekambara Naicker Industrial Estate, Alapakkam

The district has 16,940 small scale industries, notable among them being food, wood, textile, chemical, engineering, non-metallic and leather industries.

Governance

Revenue divisions and taluks
Tiruvallur District consists of three revenue divisions and nine taluks:
 Ponneri Revenue Division - Ponneri taluk, Gummidipoondi taluk
 Tiruvallur Revenue Division - Uthukkottai taluk, Tiruvallur taluk, Poonamallee taluk, Avadi taluk
 Tiruttani Revenue Division - Tiruttani taluk, Pallipattu taluk, RK Pet taluk

Avadi, Poonamallee,  taluks lie within the Chennai Metropolitan Area.

Revenue blocks, municipal corporation and municipalities
The following are the revenue blocks of the district.
 Ellapuram
 Gummidipoondi
 Kadambathur
 Minjur
 Pallipattu
 Poonamallee
 Poondi
 Pulal
 R.K.Pet
 Sholavaram
 Tiruvallur
 Tiruttani
 Thiruvalangadu
 Villivakkam

There is one municipal corporation in Tiruvallur District.
Avadi

There are six municipalities:
 Tiruvallur
 Thiruthani
 Poonamallee
 Tiruverkadu
 Ponneri
 Thirunindravur

Stray cattle
In Tiruvallur, multiple vehicle accidents have occurred due to the stray cattle. Most of the accidents related to stray cattle on the roads occurred at night, when it is harder to see the animal on roads with insufficient lights. The residents of Tiruvallur district who allow their cattle to freely wander on the roads have been warned by the police. Imprisonment of up to three years and fine up to ₹5,000 are applicable according to the provisions of the Tamil Nadu Animals and Birds in Urban Areas (Control and Regulation) Act, 1997. Police have also threatened actions according to the Indian Penal Code and Prevention of Cruelty to Animals Act, in addition the stray cattle would be sent to cow sheds operated by the government. Yet these measures have not reduced the practice of cattle owners releasing their cattle. The authorities of Tiruvallur district have also set up call center to report incidents of stray cattle.

Members of Legislative Assembly

Economy

In retail spending, the Thiruvallur district emerges third in India, only after Noida and SW Delhi surpassing Bangalore and Mumbai by a clear margin.

See also
List of districts of Tamil Nadu
Thiruthaleeshwarar Temple

References

External links

 Tiruvallur District

 
Districts of Tamil Nadu